The West Coast Don is the fifth studio album by rapper Yukmouth, released on July 14, 2009 on Smoke-a-Lot Records/Asylum Records.

Track listing

References

Yukmouth albums
2009 albums